Dunja Mijatović (born 8 September 1964) is a Bosnian human rights expert and activist, serving as the Council of Europe Commissioner for Human Rights. She was elected by the Parliamentary Assembly of the Council of Europe on 24 January 2018 and took up her new post on 1 April 2018.

Mijatović is an expert on media law and media regulation, who served from 2010 to 2017 as the OSCE Representative on Freedom of the Media (RFoM).

Early life and education
Dunja Mijatović is the daughter of politician Tatjana Ljujić-Mijatović, the former member of the Presidency of Bosnia and Herzegovina during the Bosnian War. Having studied in a variety of countries, Mijatović earned her B.Sc. at the University of Sarajevo in 1987. She then pursued a joint M.A. in European studies at a variety of universities (University of Sarajevo, University of Sussex, University of Bologna and London School of Economics), graduating in 2002 with a Master’s thesis on "The Internet and Freedom of Expression".

Mijatović is a native speaker of Serbo-Croatian. She is also fluent in English and German and has a working knowledge of French and Russian.

Career
Throughout her career, Mijatović has been engaged in media issues across a multitude of disciplines, with substantial experience in Bosnia and Herzegovina, as well as intergovernmental settings. 

As early as 1998, as one of the founders of the BiH Communications Regulatory Agency, she helped create a legal, regulatory and policy framework for the media in a complex post-war society. She was also involved in setting up a self-regulatory press council and the first free media helpline in Southeast Europe.

EU and Council of Europe posts; lecturing at home and abroad (2007–2010)
In 2007, Mijatović was elected Chair of the European Platform of Regulatory Agencies, the first woman and the first person from a non-EU Member State to hold the post. Prior to that appointment, she chaired the Council of Europe's Group of Specialists on "Freedom of Expression and Information in Times of Crisis". During her chairmanship, the CoE Committee of Ministers adopted a Declaration on the “Protection and promotion of investigative journalism” and issued Guidelines on "protecting freedom of expression and information in times of crisis.”

As an expert on media and communications legislation, she has worked in a number of countries.

In addition, she has lectured, in her home country and abroad, on various aspects of media freedom and regulation. Since 2000 she has taught media regulation at the Universities of Sarajevo and Banja Luka and, among other teaching positions, has lectured at the Academy for Political Excellence (2007-2009) and has served, since 2008, as a permanent lecturer with the joint OSCE / Ministry of Security project on "Media, Security and Hate Crime".

OSCE Representative on Freedom of the Media (2010–2016)

In 2010 Mijatović succeeded Miklós Haraszti as the OSCE Representative on Freedom of the Media (RfoM). 

In accordance with the 1997 Directive that established the post, Mijatović aimed to fulfil her mandate as OSCE Representative on Freedom of the Media by observing relevant media developments in OSCE participating States, advocating and promoting full compliance with OSCE principles and commitments concerning freedom of expression and free media, and sending early warnings and implementing rapid responses in cases of non-compliance.

In March 2013 she was reappointed for a second three-year term as OSCE RFoM Representative.

Council of Europe Commissioner on Human Rights (2018–present)
On 24 January 2018, Mijatović was elected by the Parliamentary Assembly of the Council of Europe to serve as the Council's Commissioner on Human Rights for a non-renewable term of six years. She took up her new post on 1 April 2018.

Recognition
2015 – Médaille Charlemagne pour les Médias Européens

References

External links

The OSCE Representative on Freedom of the Media's website
Representative's Twitter account: @OSCE_RFoM
Representative's Facebook page
Representative's YouTube channel
The Commissioner for Human Rights (Council of Europe)

1964 births
Living people
Politicians from Sarajevo
Serbs of Bosnia and Herzegovina
University of Sarajevo alumni
Bosnia and Herzegovina women in politics
Bosnia and Herzegovina women activists
Freedom of expression
Organization for Security and Co-operation in Europe
Council of Europe people